Stadion u Nisy is an all-seater football stadium in Liberec. The stadium is home to Czech football club Slovan Liberec and occasionally hosts matches of the Czech Republic national team. The stadium is named after the river Nisa, flowing directly behind the North Stand. Another interesting fact about the stadium, the oldest Grandstand is embedded to a rock. The capacity is 9,900 seats.

History
The stadium was built in 1933 and used for football matches of several Liberec sport clubs, the forerunners of today's Slovan Liberec. The field had a small wooden stand that time. Slovan did not use the stadium until 1978, before the club played on Městský (Municipal) stadium on the other side of Liberec. The original capacity was 5,000 spectators but after renovation work in 1995, capacity was increased to 7,000. In 1998, a lawn heating system was installed and a couple of months later, construction began on the North Stand. In 2000, Slovan Liberec installed floodlights due to a UEFA Cup match scheduled against Liverpool. Construction on the North Stand was completed in 2001.

International matches 
The Stadion u Nisy has hosted three competitive matches of the Czech national team and one friendly match.

References

External links
 Photo gallery and data at Erlebnis-stadion.de
 Official website of FC Slovan Liberec  
 Stadion U Nisy information 

Football venues in the Czech Republic
Czech First League venues
FC Slovan Liberec
Sport in Liberec
Sports venues in the Liberec Region
Buildings and structures in Liberec
Sports venues completed in 1933
1933 establishments in Czechoslovakia
20th-century architecture in the Czech Republic